Emelinus is a genus of ant-like leaf beetles in the family Aderidae. There are at least three described species in Emelinus.

Species
These three species belong to the genus Emelinus:
 Emelinus butleri Werner, 1956
 Emelinus huachucanus Werner, 1956
 Emelinus melsheimeri (LeConte, 1855)

References

Further reading

External links

 

Aderidae
Articles created by Qbugbot